Guido Barbarisi (1889–1960) was an Italian stage and film actor.

Selected filmography
 Golden Arrow (1935)
 The Former Mattia Pascal (1937)
 Who Are You? (1939)
 Two Million for a Smile (1939)
 Annabella's Adventure (1943)
 Adam and Eve (1949)
 Passionate Song (1953)
 Beatrice Cenci (1956)

References

Bibliography
 Mancini, Elaine. Struggles of the Italian film industry during fascism, 1930-1935. UMI Research Press, 1985.

External links

1889 births
1960 deaths
Italian male film actors
Italian male stage actors
Italian male radio actors
Male actors from Rome